Ruth Seeman (born 14 April 1963) is a former professional tennis player from New Zealand.

Biography
Seeman had a career high singles ranking of 212 in the world, with her best performance a round of 16 appearance at Auckland in 1988. As a doubles player she was a semifinalist at Wellington in 1989 and featured in the main draw of the 1990 Australian Open.

Her career included a Fed Cup tie in 1989, as a member of the New Zealand side that defeated Italy in Tokyo. Her only appearance in the tie came in the doubles, a dead rubber, which she and Julie Richardson lost to Laura Garrone and Laura Golarsa.

She now works as a physiotherapist in Christchurch.

ITF finals

Singles (1–2)

Doubles (0–3)

References

External links
 
 
 

1963 births
Living people
New Zealand female tennis players
Tennis people from Greater London